The Rivière des Côtes de Fer is a river in Haiti.

See also
List of rivers of Haiti

References
GEOnet Names Server

Rivers of Haiti